Nur al-Din is a male Arabic given name, translating to "light of Faith", nūr meaning "light" and dīn meaning "religion". More recently, the name has also been used as a surname.

There are many Romanized spelling variants of the name. The element نور can be spelled Nur, Noor, Nor, Nour or Nuer. The element دين can be spelled either Din, Deen or Dine. The definite article in front of the "sun letter" d is realized only as a gemination /dː/, the Arabic pronunciation being /nuːrudːiːn/. 

Syntactically, the name is an iḍāfah (genitive construction), in full vocalization nūru d-dīni. Consequently, depending on the system of Romanization, the definite article can be rendered as al, ad, ud, ed or d.

Among the variant romanized spellings in common use are Nuraddin, Nureddin, Noureddin, Noureddine, Nooradeen, Nordeen, Nourdin, Noordine, Nordine, Nuradin, Nurdin, Nooruldeen; scientific transliterations are Nur ad-Din, Nur-ud-Din, Nur al-Din, etc.

Given name

Medieval and up to 1800
Nur ad-Din, atabeg of Aleppo (1118–1174), member of the Zengid dynasty, ruler of the Syrian province of the Seljuk Empire
Nur al-Din Muhammad (died 1185), member of the Artuqid dynasty
Nur ad-Din al-Bitruji (also known as Alpetragius) (died ca. 1204), Arab astronomer and philosopher
Nur al-Din Arslan Shah I (reigned 1193–1211), Zengid emir of Mosul
Nure Sofi (died ca. 1257), Turkish religious leader
Nūr ad-Dīn 'Abd al-'Azīz Ibn al-Qamar (1326–1398), Tunisian Berber prince
Sheikh Noor-ud-din Wali (1377–1440), Kashmiri saint of the rishi order
Nuruddin Sikandar Shah (r. 1481), Sultan of Bengal
Nur ad-Din Abd ar-Rahman Jami (1414–1492), Persian poet
Nur ad-Din Abu al-Hasan Ali ibn Sultan Muhammad al-Hirawi al-Qari, known as Ali al-Qari (died 1605), Afghan Islamic scholar
Nuruddin ar-Raniri (died 1658), Indian Islamic scholar
Noor Mohammad Nooruddin (died 1719), Dai-al-Mutlaq (vicegerent) of the Dawoodi Bohra Community
Nur al-Din Nimatullah al-Jazayiri (died 1745), Safavid Iranian Ja'fari jurist, linguist and writer
Hassan Nooraddeen I (died 1799), sultan of the Maldives

Born after 1800
Ibrahim Nooraddeen (died 1892), sultan of the Maldives
Abdurrahman Nurettin Pasha (1833–1912), Grand Vizier of the Ottoman Empire
Hakeem Noor-ud-Din (1841–1914), Head of Ahmadiyya Muslim Community
Nur al-Din al-Salimi (1869–1914), Omani Ibadi scholar
Nureddin Pasha (1873–1932), Turkish military officer
Hassan Nooraddeen II, (1887–1967), sultan of the Maldives
Nureddine Rifai (1899–??), Lebanese politician
Münir Nurettin Selçuk (1900–1981), Turkish musician
Nur al-Din Kahala (born 1910), Syrian politician
Noureddin Kianouri (1915–1999), Iranian communist leader of the Tudeh Party
Nordine Ben Ali (born 1919), Algerian-French footballer
Noureddine Sammoud (1932–2022), Tunisian poet 
Nureddin al-Atassi (1929–1992), President of Syria
Nuredin Loxha (1935–1992), Kosovar Albanian theatre director
Noureddin Zarrinkelk (born 1937), Iranian film animator
Nurettin Sözen (born 1937), Turkish politician
Noureddine Yazid Zerhouni (born 1937), Algerian politician
Nooruddeen Durkee (born 1938), American Sufi
Nurettin Yardımcı (born 1944), Turkish archaeologist
Mohammad Noordin Sopiee (1944–2005), Malaysian academician
Nuruddin Farah (born 1945), Somali novelist
Nourredine Kourichi (born 1954), Algerian-French footballer
Noureddine Bouyahyaoui (born 1955), Moroccan footballer
Nur-eldeen Masalha (born 1957), Palestinian writer
Noureddine Bhiri (born 1958), Tunisian politician
Nourdine Bourhane (born 1958), Prime Minister of Comoros
Noureddine Daifallah (born 1960), Moroccan calligrapher
Nurettin Canikli (born 1960), Turkish politician
Noordeen Mashoor (born 1962), Sri Lankan politician
Nordin Mohamed Jadi (born 1962), Malaysian athlete
Nordine Zouareg (born 1962), Algerian fitness coach
Noor Deen Mi Guangjiang (born 1963), Chinese Muslim calligrapher
Noureddine Bensouda (born 1963), Moroccan civil servant
Noordin Mohammad Top (1968–2009), Malaysian-Indonesian Islamist militant
Noureddine Morceli (born 1970), Algerian athlete
Noureddine Naybet (born 1970), Moroccan footballer
Nurettin Demirtaş (born 1972), Turkish politician
Noureddine Drioueche (born 1973), Algerian footballer
Nourredine Yagoubi (born 1974), Algerian judoka
Noureddine Ziyati (born 1974), Moroccan footballer
Nordin Jbari (born 1975), Moroccan-Belgian footballer
Noureddine Daham (born 1977), Algerian footballer
Noureddine Kacemi (born 1977), Moroccan footballer
 Nordine Amrani (1978–2011), Belgian criminal and spree killer in the 2011 Liège attack.
Nordine Ben Allal (born 1978/89), Moroccan-Belgian criminal
Nourdin Boukhari (born 1980), Moroccan-Dutch footballer
Nordine Sam (born 1982), Algerian-French footballer
Nordin Gerzić (born 1983), Bosnian footballer
Nordine Oubaali (born 1986), Moroccan-French boxer
Nordin Amrabat (born 1987), Moroccan-Dutch footballer
Nordine Assami (born 1987), Algerian-French footballer
Noureddine Smaïl (born 1987), Algerian-French athlete
Nurudeen Orelesi (born 1989), Nigerian footballer
Nuruddin Khan, chief of Bangladesh army
Nourdine Midiladji, Comoros politician
Nour Eddine (singer), Moroccan film director, musician, choreographer and singer, based in Italy
Nordine Hachouf, Algerian footballer
Noor al-Deen (detainee), Syrian detained by the CIA

Surname
Mouna Noureddine (born 1937), Tunisian actress
Jalal Mansur Nuriddin (1944–2018), American poet
Mohamed Khaled Nordin (born 1958), Malaysian politician
Juliette Noureddine (born 1962), French singer known as Juliette
Zulkifli Noordin (born 1962), Malaysian politician
Zainudin Nordin (born 1963), Singaporean politician
Mohd Nasril Nourdin (born 1986), Malaysian footballer
Herdi Noor Al-Deen (born 1992), Iraqi Kurdish footballer
Muayyed Nureddin, Canadian Muslim detainee
Dara Nur al-Din, Iraqi judge and politician

Fictional
Nour El Deen Mahmoud Nour El Deen

See also 
Nur al-Din Bimaristan, medieval hospital in Damascus
Nur al-Din Madrasa, madrasa in Damascus
Nur al-Din Mosque, mosque in Hama
Nürəddin, village in Azerbaijan

References

Arabic masculine given names